is a Japanese comedy horror film directed by Hirohisa Sasaki from 2000.  It follows a young woman who, after her brother is accused of decapitating four schoolgirls, goes to a psychic in an effort to prove his innocence, only to find things spiraling out of control.

Cast
Hitomi Miwa - Satomi Kurahashi
Kazuma Suzuki - Michio Kurahashi
Ren Osugi - Colonel
Hiroshi Abe - Narimoto
Hijiri Natsukawa - Kaori Kurahashi

External links

 

2000 films
2000 horror films
2000 comedy horror films
2000s supernatural horror films
Japanese comedy films
Japanese supernatural horror films
Japanese independent films
2000 comedy films
2000 independent films
2000s Japanese films